Butternut Valley may refer to:
Butternut Valley Township, Blue Earth County, Minnesota
Butternut Valley, the valley surrounding Butternuts Creek and the Unadilla River, which flow through the town of Butternuts, New York
Butternut Valley, New Brunswick, a rural community in the Canadian province of New Brunswick